The Women's scratch event of the 2015 UCI Track Cycling World Championships was held on 21 February 2015.

Results
The race was started at 19:10.

References

Women's scratch
UCI Track Cycling World Championships – Women's scratch
UCI